The Melville Society , is an organization for the study of author Herman Melville. Founded in 1945, the Society was a result of the Melville Revival of the 1920s and 1930s and is now the oldest American society devoted to a single literary figure. 

Its primary publication is Leviathan: A Journal of Melville Studies, issued three times per year. The society has formed a cultural project in collaboration with the New Bedford Whaling Museum, the host of the Melville Society Archive, and has an editorial office at Hofstra University. It meets primarily at the American Literature Association and Modern Language Association annual conferences and has also held international meetings. It has approximately 400 members, comprising both individuals and institutions.

Founding and history
The society was founded in February 1945 by Harrison Hayford and Tyrus Hillway. Both had studied with Stanley Williams, the Yale professor of English. The membership included both academic and public figures in the Melville Revival of the 1920s and 1930s and those from late 1930s university graduate programs that began to train scholars in American literature.   

Among the presidents were Willard Thorp (1952}, Merton Sealts (1953), Harrison Hayford (1955, 1970), (1992), (1999),  Richard H. Fogle, (1961), Henry A. Murray (1966) (1980), Walter Bezanson (1967) (1989), Leon Howard (1971), Robert Penn Warren (1974), Jay Leyda (1976) (1987), Lewis Mumford (1977), G. Thomas Tanselle (1982), Hershel Parker (1991), H. Bruce Franklin (1993), Andrew Delbanco (2007) 

The Society overcame some initial skepticism. Hilway's editorial in the 1947  Melville Society Newsletter reported that critics "were willing to believe that the so-called Melville boom represented a temporary and esoteric enthusiasm for a fifth-rate literary figure...." He said that, to the contrary, the Society can reassure itself of its part in "virile and outreaching growth of Melville scholarship".

References

Notes

External links
 Society homepage

Herman Melville